Reggae Owes Me Money is the debut album by British duo The Ragga Twins, produced by hardcore duo Shut Up and Dance and released on the latter's record label of the same name. After establishing themselves as dancehall artists from the Unity soundsystem in the 1980s, the Ragga Twins switched direction in the early 1990s, combining into a duo after signing to Shut Up & Dance's label. The production duo stirred the Ragga Twins' change in direction, fusing their previous reggae and dancehall style into the Shut Up & Dance rave dance style.

Aided by the release of several charting singles, Reggae Owes Me Money reached number 26 on the UK Albums Chart. Since its release, it has been recognised as a blueprint for jungle music, which built upon its usage of ragga, reggae basslines and breakbeats. Now hailed as a classic album, most of the album's material was re-released on the Ragga Twins Step Out compilation in 2008.

Background
The Ragga Twins, consisting of brothers David and Trevor Destouche, known as Deman Rockers and Flinty Badman respectively, began as MCs for Unity, a leading sound system in London. Throughout the 1980s, they separately released music on the soundsystem's Unity label, making digital dancehall music similar in style to labelmate King Jammy. The brothers stayed faithful to the label by turning down offers from other record companies to do "voice things". Nonetheless, they both left decided to leave Unity while at the Shinolas club in Hackney on New Year's Day 1990. The brothers felt that they had spent the 1980s "not going anywhere" and "not being brought into a studio." As a musician, Rockers wanted his music to be available for others to buy, but they felt there was little opportunity. He recalled: "I remember we played against Coxsone, and one of those guys told me if I was on their system I'd be in the studio every week! It was an easy decision to leave Unity and seek new opportunities. It was essential we left."

The brothers met Hackney-based breakbeat hardcore duo Shut Up and Dance, who also ran the label of the same name, when the latter duo contacted Deman Rockers to ask if they could sample his voice. The brothers had been signed to Unity as solo acts, but Shut Up & Dance suggested they sign them as a duo. Rockers later said that "SUAD have come up with a lot of great things, trust me, but this was perhaps their greatest achievement, getting us together as an act." Shut Up and Dance, and their productions for the label, were known for the infusion of hip hop into house music with sped up hip hop beats and reggae-esque basslines, alongside unlicensed samples and sound effects, resulting in a dark style of hardcore music popular in British illegal raves around 1990. By producing the Ragga Twins, the styles of both acts merged and introduced a "new, streetwise sound" to British raves. This marked a transition for the Ragga Twins from reggae soundsystems to hardcore and acid house parties where, previously unbeknown to the brothers, they had been revered since the late 1980s.

Production and composition
Among the earliest records Shut Up & Dance produced for the Ragga Twins, "Ragga Trip" adapts lyrics Rockers had recorded for the reggae song "Hard Drugs," and criticised the excessive drug use at acid house parties. Subsequent singles were more hardcore in style and included "Spliffhead", "Hooligan 69", "Illegal Gunshot" and "Wipe the Needle." For Reggae Owes Me Money, the Ragga Twins wanted to prove to Unity "what they could have had," and hence applied an energy and enthusiasm unseen in their Unity work. Flinty Badman recalled: "Back when we started as Ragga Twins it had to work... otherwise people would say, ‘Well, if reggae owes you money why did you leave in the first place?'."

Shut Up & Dance produced the album, on which the aforementioned singles appear. Music journalist Andrew Harrison described Reggae Makes Me Money as an abrasive fusion of ragga and house music, commenting how the Ragga Twins take Shut Up & Dance's style of 'massive' house beats and shameless sampling and moves it into "weird territory." He also felt the duo's unique style of toasting is more reminiscent of "the jambering of a wino than Shabba Ranks' slick chant." Previous singles "Hooligan 69" and "Illegal Gunshot" appear. The former begins with an unlicensed sample of the intro to Prince's "Let's Go Crazy", and was popular on dancefloors due to its heavy breakbeat and pulsating bassline. "Illegal Gunshot", meanwhile, applies a ragga chat atop a bouncy rhythm. A remix of "Spliffhead" fuses deep reggae with a style reminiscent of early Mantronix, while "Ragga Trip" is highlighted for its B-boy breakbeat and Roland TB-303 acid house bass. "Juggling" and "Wipe the Needle" feature toasting and boasting atop a classic break, anticipating the style of General Levy, whereas "18" Speaker" highlights the influence of dub on Shut Up & Dance's production style. "The Killing" is an anti-heroin song and samples "High Hopes" by the SOS Band."

Release and reception 

The duo named the album Reggae Owes Me Money in reference to how they felt they had put so much work into reggae and were not being rewarded for it, saying that "reggae will always be our first loved music." Dave Jenkins of International DJ Mag elaborated: "It wasn't an ironic or humorous title: after investing 10 years of soundsystem graft and deejay craft with London's Unity Sound, they felt they weren't getting the studio breaks they saw contemporaries such as Tippa Irie or Papa Levi enjoying." Reggae Owes Me Money was released on 10 April 1991. On 1 June, the album debuted and peaked number 26 on the UK Albums Chart, staying on the chart for five weeks, including two weeks in the top 40. The reused singles "Ragga Trip" and "Illegal Gunshot" had already charted on the UK Singles Chart in 1990, peaking at numbers 76 and 51 respectively. In April 1991, a double A-side of "Wipe the Needle" and "Juggling" reached number 71, while "Hooligan 69" reached number 56 in July.

In a contemporary review for Select, Andrew Harrison highlighted the "weird" sound of the material, and commented that the "Ragga Twins are hit-and-miss exponents of the club 12-inch, so it's for the best that Reggae Owes Me Money is more of a greatest hits package than a genuine debut." He did however feel that the Ragga Twins' "ragga-House" style was more difficult to digest in album form than on twelve-inch singles, describing the record as "[v]ery hardcore indeed, and sometimes enough to make producers SUAD themselves sound mainstream."

Legacy

By fusing the Ragga Twins' reggae with Shut Up & Dance's production style, Reggae Owes Me Money became a blueprint for jungle music, a genre defined by its usage of basslines, breakbeats and ragga, and which Dan Kuper of the New Statesman describes as the first authentic British dance music genre and a direct ancestor to UK garage, grime and dubstep. In the 2018 documentary Bass, Beat and Bars, Flint Badman recalled the album as the link between reggae and jungle, "because it had us doing the reggae chatting, it added the fast sped up breaks, and it blended the two genres together, which now we call jungle." Joe Patrin of Pitchfork wrote that "the Ragga Twins' 1990-92 output, which comprised the majority of their career work until their mid-aughts comeback, lacks the 150+ BPM pace and "Amen" break-chopping most obviously identified with the [jungle] genre by 1994. But it was a solid prototype."

English MC Rodney P hailed the album as a "landmark", while Joe Muggs of Fact Magazine considers it a "classic album." Influential blogger Matt Woebot placed the album at number 7 on his list of the "100 Greatest Records Ever," calling it "the best record to emerge out of the UK acid house scene… it's also, by default, the best record to come out of the UK's Dancehall scene. And the best Grime LP ever!" Patrin acknowledged its placement in the list as an attempt to trying to rectify the Ragga Twins' standing as innovators, as the duo had become overlooked in the music media. In 2008, Soul Jazz Records released the compilation Ragga Twins Step Out, which includes all the songs from Reggae Makes Me Money with the exception of "Hooligan 69", due to Prince refusing the sample. However, the vinyl version of the compilation features a remix of the song without the Prince sample.

Track listing
All songs written by The Ragga Twins

 "Intro" – 0:51
 "The Homeless Problem" – 3:58
 "Illegal Gunshot" – 4:02
 "Love Talk" – 3:39
 "Hooligan 69" – 4:05
 "Spliffhead Remix" – 4:04
 "The Killing" – 3:57
 "Wipe the Needle" – 3:54
 "Ragga Trip" – 4:37
 "18" Speaker" – 3:45
 "Juggling" – 3:10

Personnel
The Ragga Twins – lyrics
Shut Up & Dance – production, arrangements, executive production
James SK Wān - engineering

References

1991 debut albums
Jungle music albums
Ragga Twins albums
Breakbeat hardcore albums
House music albums by English artists
Dancehall albums